Heinz Maier-Leibnitz (28 March 1911, in Esslingen am Neckar – 16 December 2000, in Allensbach) was a German physicist. He made contributions to nuclear spectroscopy, coincidence measurement techniques, radioactive tracers for biochemistry and medicine, and neutron optics. He was an influential educator and an advisor to the Federal Republic of Germany on nuclear programs.

During World War II, Maier-Leibnitz worked at the Institute of Physics of the Kaiser Wilhelm Institute for Medical Research, in Heidelberg. After the war, he spent a year working in North America, after which he returned to the Institute of Physics. He became a leader in establishing and building centers which used nuclear reactors as neutron sources for research. Maier-Leibnitz was the chairman of a special committee for designing the German Nuclear Program, and thus he was the architect of the first full-scale nuclear program of the Federal Republic of Germany. He was a signatory of the Göttingen Manifest.

The research reactor  is officially named .

Education

Maier-Leibnitz studied physics at the University of Stuttgart and the University of Göttingen. He received his doctorate in 1935, from the University of Göttingen, under the Nobel Laureate James Franck and Georg Joos – Franck had emigrated from Germany in 1933 and his successor was Joos. Maier-Leibnitz was in the field of atomic physics, and he discovered metastable, negative helium ions, which later had applications in particle accelerators.

Career

Maier-Leibnitz arrived at the Institute for Physics shortly after the arrival of Wolfgang Gentner, who became recognized as Bothe's second in command and took Maier-Leibnitz under his wing to become his mentor, critic, and a close friend. Maier-Leibnitz worked on nuclear spectroscopy, electron-gamma-ray coincidence measurements, radioactive tracers, and energy conservation in Compton scattering.

In the early years of World War II, Maier-Leibnitz first served in the German air defense and then as a meteorologist at air bases in France.

After World War II, due to the ravages of war and the Allied occupation policies, Bothe's Institute for Physics fell on hard times. Maier-Leibnitz, Kurt Starke, and other younger colleagues of Bothe left for employment in North America. Maier-Leibnitz left in the spring of 1947. When his contract expired in the spring of 1948, he returned to again work for Bothe. Maier-Leibnitz continued to work on nuclear spectroscopy and radioactive tracers in biochemistry and medicine. He also took up the study of positron annihilation in solids, which became a new tool for measuring the momentum distribution of bound electrons.

This became the nucleus of the Maier-Leibnitz school for nuclear solid state physics. One of his first major expansions was done with the appointment of Nikolaus Riehl, who had returned to Germany in 1955, after having been taken to the Soviet Union in 1945 to work on the Soviet atomic bomb project. Rather than being used to study reactor physics and technology, the swimming-pool-type reactor was used as a neutron source, and it became a versatile tool for interdisciplinary research. Furthermore, it was the seed for the entire Garching research campus.

Other members of the Nuclear Physics Working Group in both 1956 and 1957 were: Werner Heisenberg (chairman), Hans Kopfermann (vice-chairman), Fritz Bopp, Walther Bothe, Wolfgang Gentner, Otto Haxel, Willibald Jentschke, Josef Mattauch, Wilhelm Walcher and Carl Friedrich von Weizsäcker. Wolfgang Paul was also a member of the group during 1957.

Some of the other members of the group were Erich Bagge, Wolfgang Finkelnburg, and Karl Wirtz. For the first decade of nuclear energy development in the Federal Republic of Germany (FRG), it was the center of decision making, and it had representative membership from German industry. From this position, he became the architect of the first full-scale nuclear program of the FRG.

Through his experience and expertise in instrumental techniques, particularly neutron optics, Maier-Leibnitz was one of the first to realize that the neutron flux from the FRM was too low for some interesting experiments. The reactor had the first source of cold neutrons.

1972 – 1975: President of the International Union of Pure and Applied Physics
1973 – 1983: Founding Council of the Carl-Friedrich-von-Siemens Foundation

Maier-Leibnitz was a member of the German Academy of Sciences Leopoldina, various academies of sciences and humanities (Heidelberg, Bavaria, Flanders, India, Sweden, Finland, France and Austria), of the Royal Swedish Academy of Sciences.
He was co-editor of several journals, among them Nukleonik.

Maier-Leibnitz was interested in cooking as a hobby, and he was the author of the cookbook .

Honors
Maier-Leibnitz was awarded a number of honors, including:

1965 – Honorary doctorate from the University of Vienna
1966 – Honorary doctorate from the University of Grenoble
1996 – Stern-Gerlach-Medaille of the Deutsche Physikalische Gesellschaft.
1971 – Carus Medal of the German Academy of Sciences Leopoldina
1972 – Grand Cross of the Order of Merit of the Federal Republic of Germany
1973 – Honorary doctorate from the University of Reading.
1973 – Austrian Decoration for Science and Art
1979–1984 – Member and later Chancellor of the Pour le Mérite for Science and Art
1980 – Freiherr vom Stein Prize.
1981 – Bavarian Maximilian Order for Science and Art
1984 – Otto Hahn Prize of the City of Frankfurt am Main
1985 – Wilhelm Exner Medal.
1986 – Otto Hahn Prize for Chemistry and Physics of the German Chemical Society and the German Physical Society
1988 – Lorenz Oken Medal.
1991 – Grand Cross of Merit with Star and Sash of the Federal Republic of Germany
1995 – Order of Merit of Baden-Württemberg
2000 – Golden Ring of Honor of the Technical University of Munich

Notable Articles by Maier-Leibnitz

Heinz Maier-Leibnitz: , Zeitschrift für Physik 95, 499–523 (July, 1935).
H. Maier-Leibnitz: , Zeitschrift für Naturforschung 1, 243 (1946).
H. Maier-Leibnitz, W. Bothe: Experimental Nuclear Physics, Science 126, 246–247 (9 August 1957).
H. Maier-Leibnitz and T. Springer: , Zeitschrift für Physik 167, 386–402 (August, 1962).
H. Maier-Leibnitz and T. Springer: The use of neutron optical devices on beam-hole experiments, J. Nucl. Energy 17, 217–225 (1963).
H. Maier-Leibnitz: , Nukleonik 8, 61 (1966: Invention of the neutron backscattering spectrometer).
Friedrich Hund, Heinz Maier-Leibnitz, and Erich Mollwo: Physics in Göttingen with Franck, Born and Pohl, Eur. J. Phys. 9, 188-194 (1988).

Books by Maier-Leibnitz

Peter Kafka and Heinz Maier-Leibnitz  (Piper, 1982).
Heinz Maier-Leibnitz  (Interfrom, 1986).
Heinz Maier-Leibnitz  (Piper, 1986).
Peter Kafka and Heinz Maier-Leibnitz  (Piper, 1987).

Bibliography

Eckert, Michael Neutrons and politics: Maier-Leibnitz and the emergence of pile neutron research in the FRG, Historical Studies in the Physical and Biological Sciences Volume 19, Number 1, pp. 81 – 113 (1988).
Edingshaus, Anne-Lydia  (Piper, 1986).
Kienle, Paul Heinz Meier-Leibnitz, Physics Today Volume 54, Number 8, pp. 65 – 66 (2001).
Walker, Mark German National Socialism and the Quest for Nuclear Power 1939–1949 (Cambridge, 1993) .

See also
Angular Correlation of Electron Positron Annihilation Radiation

Notes

1911 births
2000 deaths
Nuclear program of Nazi Germany
People associated with the University of Zurich
University of Göttingen alumni
Academic staff of the Technical University of Munich
Grand Crosses with Star and Sash of the Order of Merit of the Federal Republic of Germany
Members of the French Academy of Sciences
Recipients of the Austrian Decoration for Science and Art
Recipients of the Pour le Mérite (civil class)
Recipients of the Order of Merit of Baden-Württemberg
20th-century German physicists
Fellows of the American Physical Society
Presidents of the International Union of Pure and Applied Physics
Members of the Royal Swedish Academy of Sciences